Automotive aerodynamics is the study of the aerodynamics of road vehicles.  Its main goals are reducing drag and wind noise, minimizing noise emission, and preventing undesired lift forces and other causes of aerodynamic instability at high speeds.  Air is also considered a fluid in this case.  For some classes of racing vehicles, it may also be important to produce downforce to improve traction and thus cornering abilities.

History
The frictional force of aerodynamic drag increases significantly with vehicle speed.  As early as the 1920s engineers began to consider automobile shape in reducing aerodynamic drag at higher speeds. By the 1950s German and British automotive engineers were systematically analyzing the effects of automotive drag for the higher performance vehicles.  By the late 1960s scientists also became aware of the significant increase in sound levels emitted by automobiles at high speed.  These effects were understood to increase the intensity of sound levels for adjacent land uses at a non-linear rate.  Soon highway engineers began to design roadways to consider the speed effects of aerodynamic drag produced sound levels, and automobile manufacturers considered the same factors in vehicle design.

Features of aerodynamic vehicles

An aerodynamic automobile will integrate the wheel arcs and headlights to reduce wind resistance into the overall shape to also reduce drag. It will be streamlined; for example, it does not have sharp edges crossing the wind stream above the windshield and will feature a sort of tail called a fastback or Kammback or liftback.
Note that the Aptera 2e, the Loremo, and the Volkswagen XL1 try to reduce the area of their back.
It will have a flat and smooth floor to support the Venturi effect and produce desirable downwards aerodynamic forces. The air that rams into the engine bay, is used for cooling, combustion, and for passengers, then reaccelerated by a nozzle and then ejected under the floor.
For mid and rear engines air is decelerated and pressurized in a diffuser, loses some pressure as it passes the engine bay, and fills the slipstream. These cars need a seal between the low-pressure region around the wheels and the high pressure around the gearbox.
They all have a closed engine bay floor.
The suspension is either streamlined (Aptera) or retracted.
Door handles, the antenna, and roof rails can have a streamlined shape. The side mirror may only have a round fairing as a nose.
Airflow through the wheel-bays is said to increase drag (German source) though race cars need it for brake cooling and many cars emit the air from the radiator into the wheel bay. Aerodynamics is extremely important to get past that limiting barrier that you go through all the time on the highway. Although spoilers may be desirable and increase handling and downforce, the limiting factor is that spoilers make aerodynamics come to play quicker, but decreases aerodynamic function by the bulky shape moving through the air.

Comparison with aircraft aerodynamics
Automotive aerodynamics differs from aircraft aerodynamics in several ways:
 The characteristic shape of a road vehicle is much less streamlined compared to an aircraft.
 The vehicle operates very close to the ground, rather than in free air.
 The operating speeds are lower (and aerodynamic drag varies as the square of speed).
 A ground vehicle has fewer degrees of freedom than an aircraft, and its motion is less affected by aerodynamic forces.
 Passenger and commercial ground vehicles have very specific design constraints such as their intended purpose, high safety standards (requiring, for example, more 'dead' structural space to act as crumple zones), and certain regulations.

Methods of studying aerodynamics

Automotive aerodynamics is studied using both computer modelling and wind tunnel testing. For the most accurate results from a wind tunnel test, the tunnel is sometimes equipped with a rolling road. This is a movable floor for the working section, which moves at the same speed as the air flow. This prevents a boundary layer from forming on the floor of the working section and affecting the results.

Drag coefficient and drag area 

Drag coefficient (Cd) is a commonly published rating of a car's aerodynamic smoothness, related to the shape of the car. Multiplying Cd by the car's frontal area gives an index of total drag. The result is called drag area, and is listed below for several cars. The width and height of curvy cars lead to gross overestimation of frontal area. These numbers use the manufacturer's frontal area specifications from the Mayfield Company unless noted. Drag area figures that do not reflect drag coefficient and frontal area figures from independent aerodynamic testing (e.g. drag areas based on manufacturer-reported figures or educated speculation) are indicated with an asterisk (*).

{|
|-valign=top
|

Downforce 

Downforce describes the downward pressure created by the aerodynamic characteristics of a car that allows it to travel faster through a corner by holding the car to the track or road surface. Some elements to increase vehicle downforce will also increase drag.
It is very important to produce a good downward aerodynamic force because it affects the car's speed and traction.

See also

 Aerodynamic stability
 Drafting
 Drag reduction system
 Downforce
 Flight dynamics
 Fluid dynamics
 Ground effect in cars
 Slipstream
 Wing

References

External links

 One of the first cars to generate downforce - The Prevost analysed in CFD

Automotive engineering
Aerodynamics
Articles containing video clips
Vehicle dynamics